Senator Sholes may refer to:

Charles Sholes (1816–1867), Wisconsin State Senate
Christopher Latham Sholes (1819–1890), Wisconsin State Senate